Bazar Budazhapovich Bazarguruyev (born January 9, 1985) is a male freestyle wrestler of Buryat descent from Kyrgyzstan. He participated in Men's freestyle 60 kg at 2008 Summer Olympics. In this competition he was ranked on 4-5 place. He lost the bronze medal fight with Kenichi Yumoto from Japan. He would later be upgraded to a bronze medal after a doping violation of a Ukrainian athlete.

He is a bronze medalist of 2007 FILA Wrestling World Championships.

References

External links
 

1985 births
Living people
People from Aginsky District
Buryat sportspeople
Olympic wrestlers of Kyrgyzstan
Kyrgyzstani male sport wrestlers
Wrestlers at the 2008 Summer Olympics
Wrestlers at the 2010 Asian Games
World Wrestling Championships medalists
Asian Games competitors for Kyrgyzstan
Olympic bronze medalists for Kyrgyzstan